Poecilotheria tigrinawesseli, also known as Wessel's tiger ornamental or Anantagiri's parachute spider, is an arboreal tarantula. It is endemic to Eastern Ghats of India and known from six locations around Andhra Pradesh.

The species is morphologically similar to Poecilotheria formosa, but genetically similar to Poecilotheria miranda.

Size
Female is much larger than male, about 8 inches. Male is 7 inches.

Identification
In the first pair of legs, the ground color is daffodil yellow. Femur has a black band distally, ending with a thin yellow band. Patella also has a thin black band distally. Tibia daffodil yellow.

In fourth pair of legs, the ground color is bluish-grey. Femur has a thin black band proximally. Patella has a thin black band as well distally. Tibia is bluish-grey in color.

Ecology
The species is confined to the eastern ghats of India. Inhabiting in tree hollows, under tree barks, rock crevices, not common in human habitations. Not much informations know about this species.

References

External links
Photos

tigrinawesseli
Spiders of the Indian subcontinent
Endemic fauna of India
Spiders described in 2006